Villundy is a village administrative division in Trincomalee Town and Gravets in Trincomalee, Sri Lanka. As of 2005, Villundy consists of 732 families with 4269 members. This area consists of Parts of Trincomalee Courts, Dockyard Road, St Mary's Street, Cathedral Street, Bakery Road, Gorge Road, Barathi Road, Fatima Road, Kadasamy Kovil Road, Inner Harbour Road and Lavendor Road. 

Villages in Trincomalee District
Trincomalee Town and Gravets DS Division